Henry John Aguirre (January 31, 1931 – September 5, 1994), commonly known as Hank Aguirre, was an American professional baseball player and business entrepreneur. He played in Major League Baseball (MLB) as a left-handed pitcher from 1955 to 1970, most prominently for the Detroit Tigers where he was a two-time All-Star player and, was the American League ERA leader in 1962. Aguirre also played for the Cleveland Indians, Los Angeles Dodgers and the Chicago Cubs. After his athletic career, he went on to become a successful businessman in Detroit, Michigan. His last name was typically pronounced "ah-GEAR-ee."

Youth in California
Nicknamed "Mex" because he was of Mexican descent, Aguirre was born on January 31, 1931, in Azusa, California, to Jenny Alva, who was born in Los Angeles Ca, and Jose Aguirre. Jose was born in Jalisco, Mexico in 1902 and emigrated with his family during the time of the Mexican Revolution. Jose and Jenny had seven children.

In his youth, Hank Aguirre worked for his father's business, the Aguirre Tortillas Factory in San Gabriel. He made, packaged and delivered tortillas. At 4 a.m., the young Aguirre would make deliveries — mostly running — before school. He graduated from Mark Keppel High School in Alhambra, California, in 1949, but his "goofy feet" (his words) prevented him from being selected to be part of the baseball team. He graduated from East Los Angeles College in 1951.

Pitching career
As a rookie for the Cleveland Indians in 1956, Aguirre struck out Boston Red Sox legend Ted Williams the first time he faced him. After the game, Aguirre asked Williams to autograph the ball. Reluctantly, Williams complied. A couple of weeks later Aguirre faced Williams again. This time the "Splendid Splinter" smashed Aguirre's first offering for a home run. While circling the bases, Williams yelled to Aguirre, "Get that ball, and I'll sign it, too."

He pitched in the big leagues for 16 years for four different teams. Before the 1958 season began, Aguirre was traded to the Detroit Tigers, where he remained for 10 years from 1958 to 1967. Aguirre was principally a relief pitcher until 1962. During a 1962 game at Yankee Stadium, Tigers manager Bob Scheffing used him as a starter when Don Mossi had arm trouble. Scheffing wanted a left-hander to pitch against the Yankees, and he chose Aguirre. Aguirre joined the Tigers starting rotation and finished the 1962 season with a 2.21 earned run average (ERA) in 42 games (22 as a starter), the best in Detroit since Hal Newhouser in 1946. Having pitched over 100 innings (216 in total) for the first time in his career, Aguirre led the Major Leagues in ERA (0.33 points lower than Sandy Koufax who was second best), won 16 games, and was selected to the American League All-Star team. He also led the American League in WHIP (walks plus hits per innings pitched) with a 1.051 average. Aguirre also finished 17th in the 1962 American League Most Valuable Player voting.

Aguirre lost his spot in the Tigers starting rotation in 1966, and returned to the bullpen. Before the start of the 1968 season, Aguirre was traded by the Tigers to the Los Angeles Dodgers for a player to be named later. In one season with the Dodgers, Aguirre allowed only three runs in 39 innings for a 0.69 ERA. Despite the good season, Aguirre was released by the Dodgers and spent the final two seasons of his big league career pitching for Leo Durocher's Chicago Cubs, where he was a combined 4–0 in 1969 and 1970.

In 16 MLB seasons, Aguirre finished with a record of 75–72 in 1,375 innings pitched, with 856 strikeouts and an ERA of 3.24.

Aguirre spent three years (1972–74) as a coach for the Cubs. He was initially hired as the team's bench coach, tasked with serving as an intermediary between irascible manager Leo Durocher, his players and the Chicago media. The post was created in the aftermath of a player revolt against Durocher in 1971. After Durocher's firing in July 1972, Aguirre continued on the Cubs' staff as bullpen coach (1973) and pitching coach (1974). He managed in the Oakland Athletics' organization in 1975–76.

Batting
Aguirre had a reputation as one of baseball's worst-hitting pitchers. He had an .085 lifetime average, going 33-for-388 at the plate, with no home runs, striking out 236 times while drawing 14 walks.

Post-baseball career
In 1979, with the encouragement and support of Jack Masterson, an executive with Volkswagen of America, and attorney John Noonan, Aguirre founded Mexican Industries, Inc. The company, based in Detroit, operated as a labor-intensive, minority-oriented enterprise that supplied specialized parts to American automobile manufacturers. After a difficult start, Mexican Industries thrived during the 1980s, becoming a multimillion-dollar business and creating hundreds of jobs (primarily for the Hispanics of southwestern Detroit's "Mexicantown"). In 1987 Aguirre was named "Businessman of the Year" by the U.S. Hispanic Chamber of Commerce.

Aguirre died on September 5, 1994, following a two-year battle with prostate cancer. He is buried in San Gabriel in the churchyard of the (Roman Catholic) Mission San Gabriel Arcángel, "where he worshiped as a boy."
Upon his death, control of the privately owned company Aguirre had founded passed to his adult children. In 1999, Mexican Industries, Inc., was unionized (following several unsuccessful attempts over the previous two decades) by the United Auto Workers labor union under Bob King. In 2001, the firm filed for bankruptcy, laid off its workers, and subsequently closed its doors. According to union activists, "Workers blame[d] the owners, not only for hostility toward their union but for mismanaging the company."

See also
 List of Major League Baseball annual ERA leaders

References

Further reading
Copley, Robert E. The Tall Mexican: The Life of Hank Aguirre — All-Star Pitcher, Businessman, Humanitarian. Houston: Piñata Books/Arte Público Press (1998).

External links

1931 births
1994 deaths
People from Azusa, California
American baseball players of Mexican descent
American League All-Stars
American League ERA champions
Bakersfield Indians players
Baseball players from California
Deaths from cancer in Michigan
Charleston Senators players
Chicago Cubs coaches
Chicago Cubs players
Cleveland Indians players
Deaths from prostate cancer
Detroit Tigers announcers
Detroit Tigers players
Duluth Dukes players
Indianapolis Indians players
Los Angeles Dodgers players
Major League Baseball bench coaches
Major League Baseball broadcasters
Major League Baseball pitchers
Major League Baseball pitching coaches
Minor league baseball managers
Peoria Chiefs players
Reading Indians players
San Diego Padres (minor league) players
Screwball pitchers